The Miss Nicaragua 2017 pageant, was held on March 25, 2017 in Managua, after several weeks of events.  At the conclusion of the final night of competition, Berenice Quezada from El Rama won the title. She represented Nicaragua at Miss Universe 2017 later that year. The rest of the finalists would enter different pageants.

Placements

Special awards

 Best Hair - El Rama - Berenice Quezada
 Miss Attitute - León - Vanessa Baldizón
 Best Body - Siuna - Magdalene Meza
 Miss Elegance - Matagalpa - Helen Martínez
 Best Smile - El Rama - Berenice Quezada
 Miss Photogenic - Estelí - Martha Meza
 Best Look - Tipitapa - Katering Medina

.

Official Contestants

.

Judges

 Brianny Chamorro - 3rd Runner-up in Miss International 2016
 Arturo Draper - Professional Makeup Artist
 Samantha Lugo - CNN Journalist
 Daniel Garzon - Nicaraguan Goldsmith
 Karen Torres Gutierrez - Regional Manager of GRUPO CERCA
 Bismarck Martinez - Fashion Designer
 Linda Clerk - Miss Nicaragua 1995
 Dr. Ivan Mendieta -  President of Dental Care  S.A

.

Background Music

Swimsuit Competition –  Clean Bandit & Sean Paul  - "Rockabye"

.

References

Miss Nicaragua
2017 in Nicaragua
2017 beauty pageants